Sport in Leicester, United Kingdom includes a variety of professional and amateur sports. 

Professional and semi professional sports teams include: Leicester Tigers (rugby union), Leicester City (football), Leicester Riders (basketball), Leicester Warriors (basketball), Leicester Lions (speedway), and the Leicestershire County Cricket Club.

Sports clubs include:  Leicester Coritanian A.C. (athletics) and Leicester Penguins Swimming Club who were awarded Sports Club of the Year by the Leicester Mercury at their annual sports awards for 2007 and 2008.

Leicester Racecourse is located to the south of the city in Oadby.

A statue was erected in the town centre commemorating Sporting Success in the year (1996) when Leicester City won the Coca-Cola Cup, Leicester Tigers won the Pilkington Cup, and Leicestershire won the County Championship.

Rugby union
Leicester Tigers on Welford Road are one of the most successful Rugby Union teams in Europe, having won the European Cup twice, the first tier of English rugby ten times, and the Anglo-Welsh Cup eight times. Notable former players include England's Rugby World Cup winning captain Martin Johnson, Neil Back, Dean Richards and Austin Healey.

Football
Leicester City have also enjoyed a fair degree of success. In 2016, they became the sixth team to win the Premier League, having started the season with odds of 5000 to 1. They have championed the second tier of the English league system on a record seven occasions, competed in the top flight regularly during their history, won three Football League Cups and reached the FA Cup Final five times, lifting the trophy for the first time on their latest attempt in 2021. In the 2008–09 season they competed in and won League One (third tier), to which they were relegated for the first time. In 2014, they returned to the Premier League after ten years away. Their current stadium is the King Power Stadium (formerly the Walkers Stadium), situated south of the city centre and near to the site of Filbert Street from which they relocated in 2002 after 111 years. Notable former managers include Jimmy Bloomfield, David Pleat, Brian Little, Claudio Ranieri, and Martin O'Neill. Notable former players include Gordon Banks (England's World Cup winning goalkeeper in 1966), Peter Shilton, Frank Worthington, Gary Lineker (the third highest goalscorer of all time for the England team with 48 goals between 1984 and 1992), Alan Smith, Emile Heskey, Neil Lennon, Riyad Mahrez, Danny Drinkwater, Robert Huth, Andy King, Simon Grayson, Harry Maguire, and N'Golo Kanté. Notable current players include Kasper Schmeichel, Wes Morgan, Jamie Vardy, Marc Albrighton, Christian Fuchs, James Maddison, Wilfred Ndidi, and Youri Tielemans.

Motor sports

Motorcycle speedway racing has been staged in Leicester on and off since 1928. In the pioneer days speedway was staged at a track known as Leicester Super situated in Melton Road and at 'The Stadium' in Blackbird Road. Post war, the Leicester Hunters joined the National League Division Three in 1949 and operated at various levels until closure at the end of 1962. The sport was revived for a spell from 1968 before the sale and subsequent redevelopment of the site ended the first Leicester Lions era in 1983.  Planning permission was granted in October 2009 for a brand-new speedway track at Beaumont Park , with Leicester Lions returning to action in the Premier League from 2011 to 2013. In 2014 the Leicester Lions raced in the Elite League.

American football
Leicester is home to the Leicester Falcons, an American football team that competes as part of the BAFA National Leagues and in 2011 was promoted to the BAFA Premier League, the highest tier of British American Football. The Falcons' home ground is located at Babington Academy, in the Beaumont Leys area of the city.

Rugby league
Leicester Phoenix is a rugby league club based in the centre of the city. The club was founded in 1986. After playing in different British Amateur Rugby League Association leagues (namely the Midlands and South West Amateur Rugby League and the East Midlands Amateur Rugby League) the Phoenix were one of the 10 founder members of the Rugby League Conference (then the Southern Conference League) in 1997 reaching the grand final in the inaugural season. Since then they have been one of the league's most consistent performers. Their 1st Grade Team currently compete in the Midlands Premier division of the Rugby League Conference.

Other sports

Leicester City Hockey Club are one of England's leading ladies clubs. Their Ladies side has won the England Hockey League on six occasions, the most recent success coming in 2012. They have also won the Women's national Cup four times and have seen a number of players selected for International representation, notably 2016 Olympic gold medalist Crista Cullen. They are based at Leicester Grammar School in Great Glen.

Leicester Rowing Club is a rowing and sculling club based in the centre of the city on the River Soar. Formed in 1882 they represent Leicester in Regatta and Head Races around Great Britain and Worldwide. The club insignia is based on the mythical Wyvern and rowers compete in the club's colours of black and white.

Leicester also has many badminton clubs in the city; most notably Leicester University, Loughborough Students, Regal Arts and Birstall.

The city also hosted British and World track cycling and Road Racing championships at its Saffron Lane velodrome and Mallory Park racing circuit in August 1970. The cycle track was improved specially for the event which was televised all over the world. Another first meant that sponsors were allowed to buy sections of the track to utilise for advertising purposes. This was also the first time that a public road – the A46 – was closed in the UK to allow the Road Race to take place. However, this was the second world championships to be hosted by the city. Leicester is also the home of Leicestershire Road Club, the oldest cycling club in the county. Notable riders from Leicester include Individual Pursuit World Champion Colin Sturgess, double World Junior Road Race Champion Lucy Garner, Commonwealth Games silver medallist George Atkins, and Daniel McLay, who in 2016 became the first rider from Leicestershire to compete in the Tour de France.

In 1989 and 2009, the city hosted the British Special Olympics. This was the adopted charity for the Lord Mayor of Leicester 2008–2009, Councillor Manjula Sood.

Until its demolition in 1999, Granby Halls was a popular live music, exhibition and sports arena in the city. It was also notable as the long serving home of professional basketball team, the Leicester Riders, from 1980 until 1999.

The Dolly Rockit Rollers roller derby league are based in Leicester. They were ranked amongst the top eight UKRDA members for 2011, and played at the Association's 2012 championship tournament as a result.

The city is also home to one of the largest Korfball clubs in the country.  Leicester City Korfball Club is based out of Regent College and DMU Korfball Club based at the university.

Leicester Blue Sox is a baseball club based in the city, they play their home games at Western Park. They currently compete in the BBF single-A central division.

Leicester was also the '2008 European City of Sport'.

References

 
Leicester